Zhuangzi Tests His Wife is a 1913 Hong Kong drama film directed by Li Minwei. It is the earliest feature film of Hong Kong cinema, and the only film made by the Huamei (Chinese-American) Studio, which was co-founded by Benjamin Brosky, who had sold his Asia Film Company in Shanghai, and Li Minwei. The film was never screened in Hong Kong. Brosky brought the film to the United States, and it became the first Chinese film to be shown abroad when it was exhibited in the Chinese communities of Los Angeles and San Francisco. It is based on the zidishu play "The Butterfly Dream" written by Chunshuzhai.

Cast
Li Minwei stars as the wife of Zhuangzi, and Li Minwei's wife Yan Shanshan (1896-1951) became the first Chinese film actress, playing a servant girl.

 Li Beihai ...  Zhuangzi
 Li Minwei ...  Zhuangzi's wife
 Yan Shanshan ...  Servant Girl

Background

Fourth century BCE Zhuangzi (or Zhuang Zhou), one of the two defining figures of Chinese Taoism, based his philosophy on all things changing, and the perception of truth depending on the context under which it exists. Throughout history, his teachings have been particularly favored by Chinese scholars and artists, many of whom were inspired by Zhuangzi's philosophy.

Plot

In other media

Operatic versions of Zhuangzi Tests His Wife have been performed on stage by the Peking Opera and others.

Most operatic versions end with Zhuangzi burying his wife after she commits suicide for being disloyal to her husband. But this version tackles the story from a different angle. While Tian Shi still ultimately kills herself, Zhuangzi turns her and himself into butterflies and then, eventually, into dust.

See also
 Cinema of Hong Kong
 List of Hong Kong films

References

External links
 Zhuangzi Tests His Wife at Internet Movie Database

Chinese silent films
Hong Kong black-and-white films
1913 films
1913 drama films
Chinese black-and-white films
Chinese drama films
Films set in the Warring States period
Silent drama films